Heikki Sakari Kalha (formerly Kronqvist, 1 September 1931 Helsinki<ref name="vammalan">Tyrvään yhteiskoulu – Vammalan lukio 1904–1979 (matrikkeli), s. 319. Vammala: Vammalan lukio, 1979. .</ref> - 10 November 1994 Helsinki) was a Finnish diplomat and a varatuomari''.

Heikki Kalha wrote a degree in Tyrvä co-school in 1950, graduated from the University of Helsinki to Law Bachelor in 1957 and received the Master of Excellence in 1960. After graduating from 1958 to 1959, he was employed by the Ministry for Foreign Affairs at the Tyrvä court notary.

Kalha served as Assistant at the Finnish Embassy in Finland in 1960, as Secretary of State for Foreign Affairs between 1963 and 1964, as Secretary of State in Madrid between 1964 and 1967 and in Tokyo from 1967 to 1969, and as Chancellor and Office Manager at the Ministry for Foreign Affairs between 1969 and 1974. He served as Ambassador of Finland to Beirut from 1974 to 1977 and at the same time in Amman and Kuwait, then in Athens from 1977 to 1980, in Bonn from 1980 to 1985, then as a negotiating officer for the Ministry of Foreign Affairs from 1985 to 1988 and again served as Ambassador in Madrid 1988–1990 and Tokyo  1990–1994.

References 

Ambassadors of Finland to Greece
Ambassadors of Finland to Jordan
Ambassadors of Finland to West Germany
Ambassadors of Finland to Spain
1931 births
1994 deaths
Ambassadors of Finland to Kuwait
Ambassadors of Finland to Japan
Ambassadors of Finland to Lebanon